Giulio Gallazzi (born 8 January 1964 in Bologna, Italy) is an Italian businessman. He is the Chairman/CEO of SRI Group, a multinational independent M&A corporate finance consultancy and proprietary Private Equity investments company founded in 2001.

Life and education
Graduated with highest grades in Business and Economics from University of Bologna. Achieved his MBA from SDA Bocconi School of Management, Milan. He completed his studies at Harvard Business School, Boston (USA) as a visiting scholar. Giulio Gallazzi is married to Serena Bortolini and has two children.

Business career
In 2001 he founded SRI Group. Today, SRI Group is a UK-based multinational company operating in corporate investment banking business with its head office in London and operational offices in Italy, Belgium and France.

In his career he has served as an independent non executive board member in several Stock Exchange listed industrial and financial  companies, among these  TIM, MFE(MediaForEurope) , Danieli, ASTM, Gruppo Carige, Ansaldo STS. 

Today he is one of the major shareholders of Gruppo Banca del Fucino[3], an Italian bank specialising in S.M.E. market.

Achievements
He was a keen American Football player (1984–1989), winning both the Italian championship in Super Bowl VI (1986 - Warriors Bologna) and European championships in Helsinki (1987 - Italian National Team) captaining the Italian team. He was voted MVP in 1988.

In 2010, he received the prestigious Business Internationalisation Award from the British Government (www.uk-italybusinessawards.it). To celebrate the success of Entrepreneurial Initiative that has chosen the United Kingdom as a key market for their international business development.

In 2012, the Group started his own direct Private Equity Proprietary investments activity with major focus on New Tech Business Transformation opportunities.

Publications
 . Co-written with other experts in the sector.
 . Co-written with other experts in the sector.
 . Co-written with L. Melina.
 . Co-written with other experts in the sector.
 . Co-written with S. Kampowski.

References

External links
Official website
SRI Group

Businesspeople from Bologna
1964 births
Living people